The 1978 Hardy Cup was the 1978 edition of the Canadian intermediate senior ice hockey championship.

Final
Best of five games won:

The Prince George Mohawks beat the Campbellton Tigers 3–1 on series.

External links
Hockey Canada

Hardy Cup
Hardy